was a Japanese castle that formed the administrative center of Hachinohe Domain, a feudal domain of the Nambu clan, located in the center  of what is now the city of Hachinohe in Aomori Prefecture, Japan. Nothing remains of the castle today.

History
Hachinohe Castle was constructed in 1627, but styled as a jin'ya due to restrictions set by the Tokugawa Shogunate, which permitted only one castle per domain. It had two sets of concentric moats, and a two-story central structure with a barracks, but no donjon. It became the headquarters of the new Hachinohe Domain in 1664.  From 1827-1829, the 8th daimyō of Hachinohe, Nambu Nobumasa, constructed a new palace in the inner bailey, as well as a martial arts training school in the second bailey. In 1838, Hachinohe Domain was upgraded in rank by the Shogunate, and for the first time Hachinohe Castle was officially styled as a “castle”.

After the Meiji Restoration, the new Meiji government ordered the destruction of all former feudal fortifications, and in compliance with this directive, all structures of Hachinohe Castle were pulled down in 1871, with the  Shinto shrine erected inner bailey in its place. The site is now an urban park, Miyagi Park, and nothing remains of the former castle aside from a monument and the local place names.

One gate built in 1797 from the palace has survived as a gate to the private residence of the descendants of Hachinohe Nambu clan, who received the title of viscount under the kazoku peerage system in the Meiji period. This  is an Aomori Prefecture Important Cultural Property.

Literature

Notes

Castles in Aomori Prefecture
Hachinohe
Nanbu clan